New Dayton is a hamlet in southern Alberta, Canada within the County of Warner No. 5. New Dayton was named for their former home by settlers from Dayton, Ohio.

Demographics 
New Dayton recorded a population of 47 in the 1991 Census of Population conducted by Statistics Canada.

Services and amenities 

The hamlet has a ball diamond, a campground and a postal outlet.

See also 
List of communities in Alberta
List of hamlets in Alberta

References 

Hamlets in Alberta
County of Warner No. 5